The 1935 Minnesota Golden Gophers football team represented the University of Minnesota in the 1935 college football season. In their fourth year under head coach Bernie Bierman, the Golden Gophers compiled an undefeated 8–0 record and outscored their opponents by a combined total of 194 to 36.

The team was named national champion by seven NCAA-designated major selectors in Billingsley, Boand, College Football Researchers Association, Helms, Litkenhous, National Championship Foundation, and Poling.

Before the season
Coach Bierman had led Minnesota to an undefeated season in 1934.

Schedule

Game summaries

North Dakota Agricultural

On September 28, 1935, Minnesota opened its season with a 26–6 victory over North Dakota Agricultural before a crowd of more than 34,000 at Memorial Stadium in Minneapolis. Minnesota scored four touchdowns, two by African-American left end Dwight T. Reed (one of them on a 40-yard pass from halfback George Roscoe) and one each by George Roscoe (on a four-yard run) and right end Ray King (on a 17-yard pass from Roscoe). Despite the victory, the Associated Press, in its account of the game, opined that the Golden Gophers "lacked the flaming spirit to win" that marked the undefeated 1934 Minnesota team.

at Nebraska

On October 12, 1935, Minnesota defeated Dana X. Bible's Nebraska Cornhuskers, 12 to 7, at Memorial Stadium in Lincoln, Nebraska. George Roscoe returned the opening kickoff 74 yards and then scored on a lateral from Glenn Seidel. Early in the second quarter, Nebraska took the lead on a long touchdown run by quarterback Jerry LaNoue and an extra point. Roscoe ran for the winning touchdown later in the second quarter.  Neither team scored in the second half. On defense, the Gophers kept Nebraska's highly touted halfback Lloyd Cardwell in check.

Tulane

On October 19, 1935, Minnesota defeated Tulane, 20–0, before a crowd of 38,000 at Memorial Stadium in Minneapolis. The Gophers scored two touchdowns in the first quarter and another early in the second quarter, then spent the remainder of the game "in the roles of guinea pigs as their football professors made observations for future scientific operation when the going is tougher." Tulane totaled only two net rushing yards for the game. Minnesota captain Glenn Seidel suffered a broken collarbone in the game. Minnesota's touchdowns were scored by Sheldon Beise (on a four-yard run), Bud Wilkinson (on a 43-yard return of a blocked punt), and Clarence Thompson (on a short run).

Northwestern
On October 26, 1935, Minnesota defeated Northwestern, 21 to 13, before a homecoming crowd of 52,000, one of the largest in Minnesota football history. Northwestern took a 13-7 lead at halftime, but sophomore right halfback Clarence Thompson led Minnesota's comeback in the second half. He scored a touchdown in the third quarter and then ran 36 yards for the winning touchdown in the fourth quarter.

Purdue
On November 2, 1935, Minnesota defeated Purdue, 29–7, in Minneapolis. Right halfback George Roscoe scored Minnesota's first touchdown in the first quarter. Left halfback Clarence Thompson also scored for Minnesota.

at Iowa
On November 9, 1935, Minnesota defeated Iowa, 13-6, in Iowa City.

at Michigan

On November 16, 1935, Minnesota defeated Michigan, 40–0, at Michigan Stadium. It was Minnesota's 23rd consecutive game without a loss and the worst defeat in the history of the Michigan football program since 1892. Minnesota gained 432 rushing yards to 99 for Michigan and also held Michigan to 35 passing yards. Clarence Thompson returned a kickoff 85 yards for a touchdown. Andrew Uram scored two touchdowns on runs of 60 and 73 yards. Sheldon Beise also scored two touchdowns. Vernal LeVoir scored on a 30-yard touchdown reception and kicked four extra points.

Wisconsin
On November 23, 1935, Minnesota defeated Wisconsin, 33-7, before a crowd of 45,000 spectators in Minneapolis. The victory was the 17th in a row for Minnesota and the 24th consecutive game without a defeat. Minnesota out-gained Wisconsin, 209 yards to 13 yards.

Postseason

Total attendance for the season was 217,785, which averaged to 43,557. The season high for attendance was against Northwestern.

Awards and honors
Guard Bud Wilkinson was named All-American by Grantland Rice and the Associated Press (AP).  Tackle Ed Widseth was named an All-American by the Walter Camp Football Foundation, United Press International (UPI), Liberty, Hearst and New York World Telegram.  Tackle Dick Smith was named an All-American by the AP, UPI, New York World Telegram and Look Magazine.  Halfback Sheldon Beise was named an All-American by the American Sports Service and New York Daily Mirror.
Beise, quarterback Babe LeVoir, Smith, Widseth and Wilkinson were named All-Big Ten.

Quarterback Babe LeVoir was awarded the team most valuable player award.

References

Minnesota
Minnesota Golden Gophers football seasons
College football national champions
Big Ten Conference football champion seasons
College football undefeated seasons
Minnesota Golden Gophers football